"I See You" is a song by American contemporary Christian musicians Chris Tomlin and Brandon Lake. It was released on August 6, 2021, as the lead single from Tomlin's fourteenth studio album, Always (2022). The song was written by Bryan Fowler, Chris Tomlin, and Jonas Myrin. Bryan Fowler handled the production of the single.

"I See You" peaked at No. 31 on the US Hot Christian Songs chart published by Billboard.

Background
On August 6, 2021, Chris Tomlin announced the release of "I See You" with Brandon Lake as a single, accompanied with the song's lyric video. Tomlin said the message of the song is "all about seeing God throughout the different seasons in life, the ups and the downs."

Composition

Critical reception
Joshua Andre of 365 Days of Inspiring Media gave a negative review of "I See You", describing the song as a "typical CCM song in that Chris and Brandon together passionately and vibrantly relay to us that we can indeed see Jesus in creation and in everything in our lives, ... we are met with an enthusiastic melody… but a melody nonetheless whereby I as a listener am not that impressed. Because you see, it's a track that is forgettable." Andre compared the song's theme to "I See You" by Rich Mullins, "At Your Name" from Tim Hughes, and "God Of Wonders" from Mac Powell and Cliff and Danielle Young. Reviewing for Plugged In, Kristin Smith said
"This sweet song reminds us that He is indeed always present, that He longs to be close to us in every moment. In fact, we are promised that the One who sees us will never leave or forsake us, that we can always rest in His love and provision. Tomlin and Lake remind us of that bedrock truth in “I See You.”"

Commercial performance
"I See You" debuted at No. 31 on the US Hot Christian Songs chart dated August 17, 2021, concurrently charting at No. 10 on the Christian Digital Song Sales chart.

Music video
The lyric video of "I See You" was published via Chris Tomlin's YouTube channel on August 6, 2021.

Track listing

Personnel
Adapted from AllMusic.
 Adam Ayan — mastering engineer
 Jesse Brock — mixing assistant
 Daniel Carson — electric guitar
 Chad Chrisman — A&R
 Nickie Conley — background vocals
 Jason Eskridge — background vocals
 Bryan Fowler — acoustic guitar, background vocals, bass, electric guitar, keyboards, producer, programmer, synthesizer programming
 Brandon Lake — primary artist, vocals
 Paul Mabury — drums
 Sean Moffitt — mixing
 Brad O'Donnell — A&R
 Chris Tomlin — primary artist, vocals

Charts

Release history

References

External links
  on PraiseCharts

 

2021 singles
2021 songs
Chris Tomlin songs
Brandon Lake songs
Songs written by Jonas Myrin